The Killer's Shopping List is a South Korean television series starring Lee Kwang-soo, Seolhyun, and Jin Hee-kyung. It aired on tvN from April 27 to May 19, 2022, every Wednesday and Thursday at 22:30 (KST) for 8 episodes.

Synopsis
It tells the story of Ahn Dae-sung (Lee Kwang-soo) and Do Ah-hee (Kim Seol-hyun) setting out to find the murderer after a body was found near the apartment where Ah-hee resides.

Cast

Main
 Lee Kwang-soo as Ahn Dae-sung
 He used to be a memorization genius, but has failed the 9th-grade civil service exam for 3 years, resulting in him being unable to find other jobs and having to work in MS Mart owned by his mother Jeong Myeong-sook.
 Kim Seol-hyun as Do Ah-hee
 Dae-sung's girlfriend who is a police officer from the Odong district.
 Jin Hee-kyung as Jeong Myeong-sook
 Dae-sung's supportive and caring mother who owns the MS Mart.

Supporting

People around Ahn Dae-sung
 Shin Sung-woo as Ahn Young-choon
 Dae-sung's father and Myeong-sook's husband.
 Lee Gyo-yeop as Jeong-yuk 
 An employee of MS Mart and close friend of Dae-sung.

People around Do Ah-hee
 Lee Yoon-hee as Kim Doo-hyun
 A good-hearted, compassionate police officer who helps a young ex-convict get back into society. Doo-hyun is someone who knows all about the events of 10-year-old Dae-sung at MS Mart and is always taking care of him.
 Bae Myung-jin as Detective Ji Woong

MS Mart people
 Oh Hye-won as Ya-chae
 An employee of MS Mart's vegetable department.
 Kim Mi-hwa as Gong-san
 An employee of MS Mart with 10 years of experience.
 Jo A-ram as Al-ba
 An part-timer employee with 7 years of experience.
 Park Ji-bin as Saeng-sun
 An employee of MS Mart's seafood department.

Others
 Moon Hee-kyung as Young-sun
 Nau-dong's daughter-in-law as the president of a neighborhood woman with a beautiful appearance and arrogant personality.
 Kwon So-hyun as Lee Kyung-ah 
 MS Mart's loyal customers at major events happening at the mall.
 Jang Won-young as Oh Cheon-won
 Ryu Yeon-seok as Seo Cheon-gyu
 Seo Yul's father.
 Ahn Se-bin as Seo Yul

Special appearance
 Park Chul-min as Ah-hee's father

Production
On February 23, 2022, the photos from the script reading held in Sangam-dong, Seoul were published.

Original soundtrack

Part 1

Part 2

Part 3

Part 4

Viewership

Spin-offs
A spin-off of the series titled The Killer's Shopping Mall, starring Lee Dong-wook and Kim Hye-jun in the lead roles, is set to premiere in 2023.

References

External links
  
 

TVN (South Korean TV channel) television dramas
Korean-language television shows
2022 South Korean television series debuts
Television series by Studio Dragon
2022 South Korean television series endings